Marcelo Eduardo Aguas Villarreal (born 1 August 1990) is a retired Mexican footballer who as of 2009/10 season played for Chiapas U20 youth team.

External links
 

Chiapas F.C. footballers
Association football forwards
People from Guadalupe, Nuevo León
Footballers from Nuevo León
1990 births
Living people
Mexican footballers